Ronald C. Tocci is an American politician from New York.

A resident of New Rochelle, Westchester County, New York. He was a Democratic member of the New York State Assembly from 1985 to 2004, sitting in the 186th, 187th, 188th, 189th, 190th, 191st, 192nd, 193rd, 194th and 195th New York State Legislatures.

A member of the State Assembly's Ways and Means Committee, Tocci was the proponent of reinstating the Stock Transfer Tax, a mode of taxation which was in effect from 1907 to 1981 in the state of New York, home to the nation's most important stock exchanges, and which produced over $300 million annually in revenues to the state and the city of New York.

In 2002, Tocci was defeated in the Democratic primary by Noam Bramson. Tocci then ran on the Republican ticket in the general election, and defeated Bramson. However, Tocci remained a registered Democrat and sat with the Democrats during his last term.

References

Democratic Party members of the New York State Assembly
Living people
Place of birth missing (living people)
Year of birth missing (living people)